Benevolence is an unincorporated community in Randolph County, in the U.S. state of Georgia.

History
The first settlement at Benevolence was made in 1831. Benevolence was so named for the "benevolent" act of a first settler who donated land at the town site so that a Baptist church could be built. A post office called Benevolence was established in 1854, and remained in operation until 1984.

By 1900, the community had 61 inhabitants. The Georgia General Assembly incorporated Benevolence as a town in 1911. The town was officially dissolved in 1995.

References

Unincorporated communities in Randolph County, Georgia